Philippe Curval is the pseudonym of Philippe Tronche (born 27 December 1929), a French journalist and science fiction writer. 

He first became of interest in 1962 and in 1977 won the Prix Apollo for Cette chère humanité (translated into English by Steve Cox as Brave Old World, Allison & Busby, 1981). He is also known for his works of science fiction criticism and as an editor.

References
The Encyclopedia of Science Fiction, page 286

Further notes

External links

1929 births
French science fiction writers
Possibly living people